St Michael's Church, also known as Brynford Parish Church, is a Grade II listed Church in Wales church in Brynford, Flintshire, northeast Wales, to the southwest of Holywell. The foundation stone was laid by the Bishop of St. Asaph on 6 October 1851, and it was consecrated on 12 July 1853. The architect was Thomas Henry Wyatt. It is designated as a Grade II listed building

References

External links
 

Brynford, St Michael
1851 establishments in Wales
Religious organizations established in 1851
Churches completed in 1853
Thomas Henry Wyatt buildings
Brynford